The striped burrfish or simply burrfish (Chilomycterus schoepfi) is a member of the porcupinefish family Diodontidae.

Description
It is distinguished from the porcupinefish by the shorter, less sharply pointed, and immovable spines which cover the somewhat spherical body.  It can inflate its body by taking either air or water into a ventral extension of the stomach.  Its color is olivaceous or brownish above and pale yellow below.  The back and sides are irregularly striped with brownish, dusky, or black lines which are parallel to each other and which run obliquely downward.  There are several large black spots on the sides, one just below the dorsal fin, and another behind the pectoral fin.  Its maximum size is about 10 inches.

Distribution
It is found mostly in the tropics of the western Atlantic Ocean from Brazil to Florida as well as along the Atlantic coast of North America, sometimes as far north as Cape Cod and regularly during the late summer and fall in the vicinity of New York.  One has been reported caught on dead shrimp as far as Oyster Lake, near Matagorda Bay, Tx.

Habitat

It spawns off New Jersey in July.  Juveniles are also found in the Chesapeake Bay in the summertime.

Diet
It feeds on invertebrates such as oysters, barnacles, mussels, small crabs, and hermit crabs.

Fishing technique
It has no commercial value but is occasionally taken by fishermen and stuffed as curio.  Some end up in the aquarium pet trade.  It occasionally is killed in gill nets and then tossed back by the fishermen.  It is often washed ashore along the beach and is a treacherous object if stepped on by mistake with bare feet.  Other species of burr and porcupinefish are found in the tropics.

References

 E. C. Raney  "Burrfish." The Wise Fishermen's Encyclopedia (1951)

External links

 

striped burrfish
Fish of the Eastern United States
Fauna of the Southeastern United States
Fish of the Gulf of Mexico
Fish of the Western Atlantic
striped burrfish